Amaseffer was an Israeli progressive metal band which was formed in 2004 in Tel Aviv by drummer and percussionist Erez Yohanan, and guitarist Yuval Kramer. A year later, a second guitarist Hanan Avramovich joined and completed the line-up. This is also when the band got its name "Amaseffer" - from Hebrew "Am Ha'Sefer" (עם הספר) - People of the (holy) book; a name from the Old Testament for the Israelites and later for the Jewish People. The band's music genre is considered progressive metal, but it contains a mixture of rock, metal, world music and Middle Eastern touches.

History

Slaves for Life (2004–2008) 
Amaseffer was formed with the idea of a historical trilogy in mind - to tell the Old Testament's story of the Exodus, from the Hebrew slavery period in ancient Egypt, through the years in the desert, and up to the entrance of the twelve tribes of Israel to the promised land of Canaan (later Israel). The first album of the trilogy, Slaves for Life, tells the story of the events starting with the Hebrews slavery, through the birth of Moses and ends with the ten plagues of Egypt.

In 2006, while the three band members were composing this first album in Tel Aviv, Israel, they started looking for a lead vocalist for the album. In August 2006 Andy Kuntz, lead singer of the German band Vanden Plas, joined the band to fulfill this duty. Through Kuntz, the band got to their recording studio, Bazement Studio, in Germany. In 2007, Kuntz and the band decided to part ways. Shortly after, the band announced that the leading vocals will be performed by Mats Levén (Krux, ex-Therion, ex-At Vance, Yngwie Malmsteen).

In November 2007, the band completed the recording of the album, featuring additional musical artists like vocals by Angela Gossow (Arch Enemy), Kobi Farhi (Orphaned Land), Yotam Avni (Prey for Nothing) and Maya Avraham; flutes by Amir Gvirtzman; tablas by Yatziv Caspi (Solstice Coil); bass guitar by Yair Yona. In April 2008, the band signed with Inside Out Music, and the first album was released on 2008-06-06 in Israel, Germany, Austria and Switzerland and by 2008-06-24 released worldwide.

After the production of the first album, the band was approached by an Israeli filmmaker to record and produce the full score soundtrack for the movie "Altalena" - a movie about the Altalena Affair from 1948. This led to the forming of a legal company with the purpose to produce movie soundtracks all over the world, in addition to the Exodus trilogy.

When the Lions Leave Their Den (2009–2010)
In June 2009, the band decided not to implement the three-record deal with Inside Out Music and left the label. In January 2010, Amaseffer went into their studio in Jerusalem, with Mats Levén returning on vocals, in order to finish the second installment of the trilogy, with a projected release date of early 2011 once another record label was found. On April 9, 2010, the title of the second album was revealed to be When the Lions Leave Their Den. The name of the album's opening track was also revealed to be "Pillar of Fire", and it was written by Yotam Avni of Prey for Nothing, who wrote all the lyrics for the new album. The recording of the album was allegedly finished in July 2010, and it was mixed and mastered in Germany. However, the album has not yet been released.

Kna'an collaboration with Orphaned Land (2016–present)
After a 6-year silence since their last announcement concerning their still-unreleased second full-length album in 2010, Amaseffer resurfaced in 2016 with a collaboration effort, entitled Kna'an, featuring fellow Israelis Orphaned Land. The work was released in July 2016 via Century Media Records. However, that same year, not long after the release of Kna'an, the band receded into another lengthy absence, with no updates regarding any activity.

Discography
Studio albums:
2008: Slaves for Life

Other albums:
2016: Kna'an (with Orphaned Land)

Band members
Current members
 Hanan Avramovich - guitars (2004–present)
 Yuval Kramer - guitars (2004–present)
 Erez Yohanan - drums, percussion, narrating (2004–present)

Featuring
 Mats Léven - lead vocals (2007–present)

Former members
 Andy Kuntz - lead vocals (2006–2007)

References

External links
Former official website

Oriental metal musical groups
Israeli progressive metal musical groups
Musical groups established in 2004
Israeli musical trios
2004 establishments in Israel
Inside Out Music artists
Jewish heavy metal musicians